From The Airport (Hangul: 프럼 디 에어포트) is a South Korean indie duo formed in 2012. The band consists of Milo and Zee.

History

Formation
From The Airport came together in early 2012 when Milo (Producing, Guitar, Bass, Keys, Vocals) and Zee (Producing, DJ, Drums, Keys, Vocals) met at a friend's underground studio. They quickly realized they both had very similar musical taste and style and arranged to do a jam session for fun. During the session, the duo‟s natural chemistry led them to experiment and create the product of which was the foundation for their first track “Colors.”

Both Milo and Zee have a nice blend of experiences prior to teaming up. Milo’s guitar mastery and composing prowess were honed from film music production (Jesus Band, Korea, Shirano Agency) and Zee developed on the keys and DJ/producing while composing for K-pop music scene (Banana Dynamite, MC Sniper, J). Together, their collaborative abilities and skills synergize to create From The Airport’s unique sound. A mix of energizing distortions, enchanting dance beats, soaring melodies, and moving lyrics, From The Airport is constantly evolving and pushing their music with each note they write.

After a while, the duo named the team 'From The Airport', with the meaning of amplifying musical messages to listeners around the world and to capture the starting point of emotions, which they deemed to be airports.

Debut Single
In October 2012, From The Airport released their debut single album, 'Colors,' with the title track of the same name. The track was mixed by From The Airport and mastered by Chris Athens at Chris Athens Masters.

From The Airport's first two singles, 'Colors' and 'Everyone's All Right,' was well received by the world media and audience. Garnering attention from UK media, The Guardian, From The Airport was named as one of the international bands of the Month February 2013. From The Airport's video for 'Colors' was instantly addictive with an electro-indie-rock mixture of music.

Rising Popularity from 'Timelines'
From The Airport returned with its third single track '"Timelines." The track was once again received well by the public, being able to bump Grammy award winners, Daft Punk, from the top spot on the US’s Indie Shuffle charts. From The Airport was reviewed by multiple publications from all around the world, and being compared to bands such as Two Door Cinema Club, Passion Pit and Strange Talk.

From The Airport was selected as May 2013's hidden artist of the month by Bugs Music, one of the top music distributors in South Korea.

Label
In June 2013, the high flying duo decided to take the next step and signed with Fluxus Music, a Korean music label that consists of Korea’s top pop/indie artists such as Clazziquai Project, Urban Zakapa, and Yi Sung Yol.

Major Debut
Leaving the basement studio for brighter skies, they created their first EP album, ‘Chemical Love’ which was released in February 2014 and shared a message of positivity and optimism for the lives and life around us. From The Airport released their first full-length Album, ‘You Could Imagine’ on January 9, 2015.

Members
 Milo - guitars, bass, vocals, synthesizers, production
 Zee - DJing, vocals, synthesizers, drums, production

Discography

Studio albums

Extended plays

Single albums

References

External links

 
 
 
 
 
 

South Korean indie rock groups
Musical groups established in 2012
2012 establishments in South Korea
South Korean musical duos